Gerry Gilbert (April 7, 1936 in Calgary - June 19, 2009 in Vancouver) was a Canadian poet famous in underground literature for his deliberate eschewing of all awards and competitions as he felt that personal ambition in art led to a lack of sincerity. He was known as Vancouver's bicycle poet.

Life
Gilbert was a multimedia artist who worked comfortably as writer, film-maker, photographer, performance artist and more. He was born in 1936 during a trip between Toronto and Vancouver forcing his parents to stop briefly in Calgary. His art reflects this unique birth as much of its allure is a kind of tension between remaining and continuing. He attended the University of British Columbia (1954–56) before traveling to England and further study there. Gilbert then returned to Vancouver and although he died there he managed to live and travel across Canada and Europe in his younger years.

Gerry became a well known local fixture in the Vancouver art scene and began a periodical anthology of writing that he distributed himself called the British Columbia Monthly (later becoming simply B.C. Monthly) in 1972 placing him among the ranks of Canadian artists participating in the mimeograph revolution. To some he was known as 'the Jude the Obscure of Vancouver poetry'.

Gerry hosted a radio show for many years on CFRO-FM Radio called radiofreerainforest. Gilbert's film and photography have been exhibited by the Vancouver Art Gallery, the Morris and Helen Belkin Art Gallery, the Western Front, and the Contemporary Art Gallery (Vancouver). He was a prolific writer whose work spanned from the early sixties into the beginnings of the 21st century. His largest and most comprehensive work is Moby Jane published by Toronto's Coach House Books in 1987.

Bibliography
1964:White Lunch, Periwinkle Press 
1969:Phone Book, Weed Flower Press & Ganglia Press 
1970:Doi,ngng, National Film Board of Canada, 
1971:And, blewointment press 
Money, Georgia Straight Writing Supplement
1972:Lease, Coach House Press 
1974:Skies, Talon Books 
1974:Journal to the East, blewointment press 
1976:Grounds, Talon Books  
1977:From Next Spring, Coach House Books 
1987:Moby Jane, Coach House Press  
1988:So Long Song, Gorse Press 
1989: The 1/2 of It, Wave 7 Press 
1991:Azure Blues, Talon Books  
1994:Year of the Rush, Underwhich Editions  
1995:Sex and the Single Mushroom, Letters  
1998:Poem Boooooooooooook, above/ground press 
Canadian Answers: Zap Poetry, Laurel Reed Books 
2006:Perhaps, Bookthug

See also

Canadian literature
Canadian poetry
List of Canadian poets

References

From There to Here, by Frank Davey pp119–122, 1974 Press Porcepic 
In The Works: Back Roads to Next Spring's Gerry Gilbert Bibliography, by Nick Drumbolis, Letters, 1991, 370 p.
New Star Books, News, Gerry Gilbert 1936-2009 http://www.newstarbooks.com/news.php?news_id=40034
Vancouver Art in the Sixties, People/Gerry Gilbert http://www.vancouverartinthesixties.com/people/32
ABC BookWorld/Gerry Gilbert http://www.abcbookworld.com/view_author.php?id=3429

External links
 

 6 poems
Alex Waterhouse-Hayward, Gerry Gilbert's Bicycle
Robert Thompson, "On, The Way to Gerry Gilbert's Moby Jane Through Picture Windshield", Studies in Canadian Literature
Jamie Reid, Gerry Gilbert 1936-2009, Schroedinger's Cat
Gerry Gilbert tribute site
Records of Gerry Gilbert are held by Simon Fraser University's Special Collections and Rare Books
Gerry Gilbert radiofreerainforest Collection at Simon Fraser University's Special Collections and Rare Books

20th-century Canadian poets
Canadian male poets
21st-century Canadian poets
2009 deaths
1936 births
Writers from Vancouver
20th-century Canadian male writers
21st-century Canadian male writers